General Police (Ret.) Drs. Sutanto (born 30 September 1950, on Comal, Pemalang, Jawa Tengah) was the Head of Indonesian State Intelligence Agency since October 22, 2009 to October 19, 2011. Previously he was Chief of the Indonesian National Police since July 8, 2005 to 30 September 2008.

He graduates Police Academy in 1973. He was previously the Head of the Executive Agency Daily (Kalakhar) National Anti-Narcotics Agency. He became aide to President Suharto in 1995 - 1998, Regional Police Chief (Kapolda) of North Sumatra (2000), and the East Java police chief (October 17, 2000-October 2002).

Family 
 Wife: Henny S
 Children: Tanti Ari Dewi, Wenny Natalia Dewi, Bimo Agung Wibowo dan Widya Ari Dewi

References
  Profile in Tokoh Indonesia

Living people
1950 births
Indonesian police officers
People from Pemalang Regency
Democratic Party (Indonesia) politicians